Tauriana was a town of ancient Macedonia, inhabited during the Hellenistic and Roman periods.

The site of Tauriana is tentatively located near modern Chorigi.

References

Populated places in ancient Macedonia
Former populated places in Greece